The ASM Alice C. Evans Award for Advancement of Women is an award given by the American Society for Microbiology (ASM) to an ASM member who has made outstanding contributions to the status of women in microbiology and related sciences. The award aims to promote full participation and equal opportunity for women in microbiology. The award is named in honor of Alice Catherine Evans, the first woman to become an ASM president.

Recipients
The awardees are:
 2023: Lorraine Findlay
 2022: Gemma Reguera
 2021: Jennifer B. Glass
 2020: Caitilyn Allen
 2019: Hazel Barton
 2018: Carolyn Teschke
 2017: Diane Griffin
 2016: Carol Gross
 2015: Nancy Hopkins
 2014: Bonnie L. Bassler
 2013: Joan Steitz
 2012: Micah I. Krichevsky
 2011: Susan L. Forsburg
 2010: Sara Rothman
 2009: Millicent Goldschmidt
 2008: Jo Handelsman
 2007: Martha M. Howe
 2006: Joan W. Bennett
 2005: Helen Conrad Davies
 2004: Marian C. Johnson-Thompson
 2003: Eva Ruth Kashket
 2002: Marlene Belfort
 2001: Alice Shih-hou Huang
 2000: Anne Morris Hooke
 1999: Ruth L. Kirschstein
 1998: Arnold L. Demain
 1997: Ellen Jo Baron
 1996: Jean E. Brenchley
 1994: Barbara Iglewski
 1993: Lorraine Friedman
 1992: Ruth E. Gordon
 1991: no award
 1990: Margaret Pittman
 1989: Viola Mae Young-Horvath
 1988: Rita R. Colwell
 1986: Elizabeth O'Hern
 1985: Loretta Leive
 1983: Frederick C. Neidhardt

References

Awards established in 1983
Microbiology awards